Epidendrum subsect. Umbellata Rchb.f. (1861) is a subsection of section E. sect. Planifolia Rchb.f. (1861) of subgenus E. subg. Epidendrum Lindl. (1841) of the genus Epidendrum of the Orchidaceae (orchid family). Plants of E. subsect. Umbellata differ from the other subsections of E. sect. Planifolia by producing inflorescences which are umbel-like. In 1861, Reichenbach  recognized ten species in this subsection.  Of these, nine are recognized with the same names by Kew (page numbers refer to Reichenbach):

 E. piperinum Lindl. (1845) (p. 401)
 E. difforme Jacq.(1760) (pp. 402–403)
 E. lacertinum Lindl.(1841) (pp. 403–404)
 E. latilabre Lindl.(1841) (p. 403)
 E. longicolle Lindl. (1838) (p. 404)
 E. nocturnum Jacq. (1760) (p. 404), the type species of the genus Epidendrum
 E. sculptum Rchb.f. (1854) (p. 401)
 E. tetraceros Rchb.f. (1852) (p. 403)
 E. tolimense Lindl. (1845) (p. 402)

The tenth species listed by Reichenbach, E. ensatum, is identified by Kew as a synonym of E. anceps Jacq. (1763), which was classified by Reichenbach (p. 385) in the subsection E. subsect. Integra of [[Epidendrum sect. Schistochila|E. sect. Schistochila]] of E. subg. Amphiglottium.

The diagnosis and name of this subsection were published on page 397 of Reichenbach, 1861, as
Folia plana, bracteis depauperatis. floribus umbellatis . . . . . . . . . . C. Plaifolia umbellata.''

References

 
Plant subsections